Gipuzkoa is a province in the autonomous community of the Basque Country, Spain. It is divided into 88 municipalities.

See also
Geography of Spain
List of cities in Spain

References

 
Gipuzkoa